Heinrich Karl Strohm (4 February 1895 – 9 June 1959) was a German opera manager of the Vienna Staatsoper. He was born in Elberfeld and died, aged 64, in Cologne.

References

1895 births
1959 deaths
German male conductors (music)
Opera managers
20th-century German conductors (music)
20th-century German male musicians